Antoine Pierre Schildwein (10 August 1911 – 24 September 1995) was a French gymnast. He competed at the 1936 Summer Olympics and the 1948 Summer Olympics.

References

External links
 

1911 births
1995 deaths
French male artistic gymnasts
Olympic gymnasts of France
Gymnasts at the 1936 Summer Olympics
Gymnasts at the 1948 Summer Olympics
People from Sarreguemines
Sportspeople from Moselle (department)
20th-century French people